Ahmed Oun (born c. 1946) was a Major General in the Libyan Armed Forces. He was the head of Technical Affairs and Heavy weapons in the Ministry of Defense. In the late 2008 he was appointed as the Executive Secretary of the North African Regional Capabilities NARC by the North African Joint Chiefs, which is a part of the African Standby Force.

Early life and education 
Ahmed Oun ( احمد عون) was born in 1946 in Tripoli, Bab al-Azizia. He was raised in the area between the British military camps and the remnants of Italian occupation in Al-Sreem Street. During that time, he and many Libyans of his generation were suffering from cruel life and disturbed economic conditions that the world experienced after the end of World War II. He was raised as an orphan as his father died while his mother was pregnant with him. He completed his education in Tripoli schools where he participated in student uprisings and demonstrations demanding the withdrawal of British and American troops from Libya.

Career 
In 1966, after earning a high school diploma and because of his early sense of patriotism, he left his family to join the Royal Military Academy in Benghazi. He graduated in 1968 then he was directed to the Signal Corp as an Army Signal officer. Shortly after, he joined the Movement of the Free Officers Unionists, which was a secret movement at that time, to be the youngest officer to join the movement. Then he left for a Military Signal course in the U.S.A. He then returned to participate in the revolution (Al-Fatah September 1969) that was done by the Libyan Army, which ended the era of the royal power.
 
At the end of 1969, he participated in the delegation that was in charge of negotiating the evacuation of British and US troops and bases from Libya, which successfully led to the evacuation. Later he volunteered with a group of Libyans to join The Popular Front for the Liberation of Palestine, at its headquarters in Gota in Damascus – Syria, to help them in Liberation of their country.

At the end of 1969, he participated in the delegation that was in charge of negotiating the evacuation of British and US troops and bases from Libya. Later he volunteered with a group of Libyans to join Popular Front for the Liberation of Palestine, at his headquarters in Ghouta in Damascus – Syria.

During his time with the Libyan Army, he held various commands and worked his way through that ranks till becoming a Major General in 2004 as the head of Technical Affairs and Heavy Weapons in the Libyan army.

Battles 

Ahmed Oun commanded in the military operation against Chadian troops in 1986. He was in charge of Libyan troops that were defending the Doom Valley front in the border region between the two countries.
General Ahmed Oun was deactivated by seif al Islam al ghadafi prior to the 2011 uprising, which made him stand against the regime claiming he wanted to reduce civilian casualties and save the lives of Libyans, saying that his beliefs and principles won’t allow him to participate of the killing of civilians.

Positions 
1968 - 1969	Head of Signal Section	                       Camp Garyounes - Benghazi
1969 - 1970	Commander of Armored Vehicles Section  	       Ben Younes – Benghazi
1970 - 1977	Commander of the Guardian Infantry Battalion Bab al-Azizia - Tripoli
1977 - 1988	Head Master of the Military School	       Tripoli
1988 - 1989	Commander of the 6th Brigade Infantry	       Al-Bombh Bay
1989 - 1990	Deputy Chief of Operations and Training Bab al-Azizia - Tripoli
1990 - 1994	Chief of The Guard Brigade	               Tripoli
1994 - 1995	Chief of Operations and Training	       Jufrah
1995 - 2001	Chairman of the Military Sports Federation Tripoli
1999 - 2011	Head of Technical Affairs	               Tripoli / Jufrah
2008 - 	        Executive Secretary of NARC Tripoli

Education 
1968	Signal and Communications Diploma	        Benghazi
1969	Maintenance of Military Communication Systems 	U.S.A
1970	Armored Vehicles Course 	                Tripoli
1970	Infantry Heads Course	                        Egypt
1975	Advanced Infantry Course	                Benghazi
1981	Parachute Training	                        Benghazi
1981	Head of Infantry Brigades Diploma	        Czechoslovakia
1985	Chief and Command Diploma	                Czechoslovakia

Awards and Medals 
Medal of Bravery in 1970
Order of the Republic Military Units in 1970
Medal of Military Duty – first class – in 1974
Medal of Military Duty – second class – in 1989
Medal of Military Training – first class – in 1973
Medal of Military Training – second class – in 1982 
Medal of voluntary service and a good manners
Medal of the Arab Mujahideen
Medal of the Arab Union

References

External links
https://web.archive.org/web/20140619154522/http://www.usaraf.army.mil/NEWS/NEWS_100519_LIBYA.html
http://www.apsta-africa.org/downloads/events/2009/asfaug09rep.pdf
http://www.algeria-watch.org/fr/article/mil/chefs_etat_major.htm

Libyan generals
1946 births
Living people